Rouairoux is a commune in the Tarn department in southern France.

Geography
The Thoré forms the commune's southern border; the Fontanelles, a tributary of the Thoré, forms part of its eastern border; the Peyrettes, another tributary of the Thoré, forms most of its western border.

See also
Communes of the Tarn department

References

Communes of Tarn (department)